Philippines competed at the 1987 World Championships in Athletics in Rome, Italy, from August 28 to September 6, 1987. The Philippines fielded 2 athletes who competed in 2 events.

Results

Men
Field events

Women
Field events

References

Nations at the 1987 World Championships in Athletics
1987
World Championships in Athletics